Malapterurus electricus is a thickset fish with six mouth barbels and a single fin on its back, just anterior to the rounded tail fin. It uses its power to defend itself and to capture prey.

Distribution
In Africa, it occurs in the Nile and tropical Africa (exclusive of Lake Victoria), Lake Turkana, Lake Chad and Senegal basins.

Biology 
Occurs among rock favors standing water. Active at night, feeding mainly on fish stunned by electric shocks. The electric organ, capable of discharging 300-400 V, is derived from pectoral muscle and surrounds almost the entire body. It is used both for prey capture and defense.

Life history 
This is an Old World catfish. It is reputed that Doctors in ancient Egypt used shocks from the Electric Catfish to reduce the pain of arthritis. This trait is still used today in some areas. It also has the earliest reference of them as hieroglyphics on the walls of ancient Egyptian tombs some 5,000 years ago.

Economy 
Malapterurus electricus is eaten as food in parts of Africa. Being a food fish, M. electricus is also encountered in the pet trade as an aquarium fish.

The electric organs of Malapterurus have been used in studies of neuronal metabolism, axonal transport.

Reproduction 
In their natural habitat they form pairs and lay their eggs in excavated cavities or holes. The male takes the eggs into his mouth. There have been rumours that they are mouth brooders. It is also unknown how the fry is immune to the electric shocks by the parents

In the aquarium
Malapterurus electricus is sometimes encountered in aquarium supply stores. It is quite hardy and greedily accepts most foods, although some experimentation may be required to find the best food. The only other animals that are compatible with this species are snails, which they will ignore. They are active burrowers and will often remove the gravel from under their favorite hiding spot. It is illegal to possess any species of electric catfish for personal or commercial use in Florida.

References

Further reading 

 Norris, S. M. (2002). A revision of the African electric catfishes, family Malapteruridae , with erection of a new genus and descriptions of fourteen new species, and an annotated bibliography. Ann. Mus. R. Afr. Centr., Sci. Zool., 289:155 p
 Sagua, V. (1987). On a new species of electric catfish from Kainji, Nigeria, with some observations on its biology. J. Fish Biol., 30: 75-89.

Malapteruridae
Fish of Africa
Fish described in 1789
Strongly electric fish
Taxa named by Johann Friedrich Gmelin